Shlanlykulevo (Şlanlıkül) is a rural locality (a village) in Arslanovsky Selsoviet, Buzdyaksky District, Bashkortostan, Russia. The population was 251 as of 2010.

Geography 
Shlanlykulevo is located 10 km northwest of Buzdyak (the district's administrative centre) by road. Starye Bogady is the nearest rural locality.

References 

Rural localities in Buzdyaksky District